Wolfram Waibel Jr. (born 22 February 1970) is an Austrian sport shooter.

He was born in Hohenems, Austria.  He competed for Austria and won both a silver medal and a bronze medal in the 1996 Summer Olympics.  He shares the world record in the 50 meter rifle prone competition.

Current world record in 50 m rifle prone

References

External links
 sports-reference
issf bio

1970 births
Living people
Austrian male sport shooters
Olympic shooters of Austria
Shooters at the 1992 Summer Olympics
Shooters at the 1996 Summer Olympics
Shooters at the 2000 Summer Olympics
Shooters at the 2004 Summer Olympics
People from Hohenems
Olympic silver medalists for Austria
Olympic bronze medalists for Austria
Olympic medalists in shooting
Medalists at the 1996 Summer Olympics
Sportspeople from Vorarlberg